The Mecca fire of 1997 was a fire that occurred in the tent city near Mecca in Saudi Arabia 15 April 1997, killing between 217 and 300 people.

Details
The fire erupted in the overcrowded tent city, Mina, where an estimated two million Muslim pilgrims were gathered on for the first day of the Hajj, the ritualistic pilgrimage to Mecca. The fire erupted at 11:45 a.m. (AST), and was caused by exploding canisters of cooking gas, according to witnesses. The fire was fanned by winds of nearly  causing the destruction of an estimated 70,000 tents. Officially, 1,290 were injured and 217 killed, though witnesses and local newspapers claimed at least 300 were killed, many trampled in the panic. Later official reports gave a death toll of 343, no official list of fatalities has been published. Opposition sources claimed over 2,000 deaths had occurred, many from trampling. The fire was fought by three hundred fire engines as well as helicopters, and controlled in three hours.

See also
 Incidents during the Hajj

References

1997 fires in Asia
Fires in Saudi Arabia
Incidents during the Hajj
Islamic pilgrimages
20th century in Mecca
1997 in Saudi Arabia
April 1997 events in Asia
1997 disasters in Saudi Arabia